Bursa grayana is a species of sea snail, a marine gastropod mollusk in the family Bursidae, the frog shells.

Distribution
This species occurs in the Caribbean Sea and the Gulf of Mexico; in the Atlantic Ocean off Brazil.

Description 
The maximum recorded shell length is 55 mm.

Habitat 
Minimum recorded depth is 0 m. Maximum recorded depth is 93 m.

References

 Rosenberg, G., F. Moretzsohn, and E. F. García. 2009. Gastropoda (Mollusca) of the Gulf of Mexico, Pp. 579–699 in Felder, D.L. and D.K. Camp (eds.), Gulf of Mexico–Origins, Waters, and Biota. Biodiversity. Texas A&M Press, College Station, Texas.

External links
 

Bursidae
Gastropods described in 1862